Dragon Rage is a 1982 board game published by Heritage/Dwarfstar.

Gameplay
Dragon Rage is a game in which various groups of creatures, including Dragons, Giants, Goblins and Orcs try to break into a walled city to avenge the destruction of some Dragon eggs by a few city dwellers.

Reception
Matthew J. Costello reviewed Dragon Rage in The Space Gamer No. 63. Costello commented that "Dragon Rage is a worthwhile game.  to some extent, I felt like I was playing out a tactical skirmish from Chaosium's Dragon Pass, Rage is an intriguing game, drawing you back for another go and it's a quick setup.  One can only bemoan the passing of Heritage and the Dwarfstar line of games."

References

Board games introduced in 1982
Heritage Models games